The following is a list of mainland Chinese films first released in 2007. There were 74 Chinese feature films released in China in 2007.

See also 
 2007 in China

References

External links
IMDb list of Chinese films

Chinese
Films
2007